Sumar Rural District is a rural district (dehestan) in Sumar District, Qasr-e Shirin County, Kermanshah Province, Iran. At the 2006 census, its population was 227, in 64 families. The rural district has 8 villages.

References 

Rural Districts of Kermanshah Province
Qasr-e Shirin County